Phil Miler is a Brazilian actor and an internationally awarded voice actor.

Filmography 
 1999 - "Tiro & Queda" - (TV series) .... Jogador
 2000 - Woman on Top (as Phil) .... Gaffer
 2002 - Lost Zweig  (voice)
 2002 - Seja o Que Deus Quiser .... Cleonilson
 2003 - Aquaria (uncredited) .... Tulio Fachini
 2004 - Pele Forever  (documentary) (voice)
 2004 - "A Diarista" .... Hilton (1 episódio, 2004)
 2004 - O Spa (TV series)  .... Hilton
 2004 - "Senhora do Destino" (TV series)  .... Padre
 2005 - The Snake King (TV movie) .... Dr. Richman (as Marcelo Gomes de Oliveira)
 2005/2006 - "Os ricos também choram" (TV series) .... Adolfo Coimbra
 2007 - Caixa Dois .... Manoel - Português
 2008 - O Flagra, a Demissão e a Adoção (TV series) .... Ronaldo
 2008 - "Casos e Acasos" (TV series)  .... Ronaldo
 2009 - Mega Monster Battle: Ultra Galaxy - Ultraman Leo (Voice)
 2010 - "Bipolar" (TV series) .... Pachoulli
 2010 - Ultraman Zero: The Revenge of Belial - Zoffy (Voice)
 2011 - Rio - Avary intern/Waiter
 2011 - O Palhaço (Movie) .... mayor Romualdo
 2012 - Ultraman Saga'' - Ultraman Leo (Voice)

References

Sources
Clube da Voz 
http://www.jornalbrasil.com.br/interna.php?autonum=12614 
https://web.archive.org/web/20110715104707/http://www.portaldapropaganda.com/midia/2010/03/0002

External links 
 
 CCSP

Living people
Brazilian male television actors
Brazilian male telenovela actors
Brazilian male film actors
Year of birth missing (living people)